Nemipterus peronii, commonly known as the notchedfin threadfin bream, is a marine fish native to the western Pacific Ocean.

References

Fish of Thailand
Fish of Australia
peronii
Fish described in 1830